Balara-Arnaha is Ward No.5 of balara municipality in Sarlahi District in the Province no.2 of south-eastern Nepal. At the time of the 1991 Nepal census it had a population of 2,618 people residing in 447 individual households.

References

External links
UN map of the municipalities of Sarlahi  District

Populated places in Sarlahi District